Perla Ruth Albertsdóttir (born 21 September 1996) is an Icelandic handballer who plays for Icelandic top division side Fram and the Icelandic national team as a center back. Perla started playing handball at the age of 17 and within three years, she had been selected for the national team

In June 2019, Perla signed with Fram.

References

1996 births
Living people
Perla Ruth Albertsdóttir
Perla Ruth Albertsdóttir
Selfoss women's handball players